Yby Yaú is a district and city located in the department of Concepción of Paraguay.

References

Districts of Concepción Department, Paraguay
Populated places in Concepción Department, Paraguay
Populated places established in 1984